Man's best friend is a common phrase about domestic dogs. It may also refer to:
 The domestic dog

Film and television 
 Man's Best Friend (1935 film), a feature film about the adventures of a boy and his dog
 Man's Best Friend (1952 film), a cartoon short starring Goofy
 Man's Best Friend (1993 film), a black comedy horror movie
 "Man's Best Friend" (The Ren & Stimpy Show), an unaired episode of The Ren & Stimpy Show

Music and literature 
 Man's Best Friend (album), a 1980 album by Livingston Taylor
 Man's Best Friend (manga), a 2006 Japanese sex comic
 Man’s Best Friend, a 2021 EP by Cavetown
 Mansbestfriend, a series of albums by Sole
 "Man's Best Friend", a 1993 song by Jeff Watson from Around the Sun